Tommy Milner (born January 28, 1986), is an American GM factory racing and test driver, also currently employed full-time in Corvette Racing. He is also the co-owner of PRIVATE LABEL Team Hype E-Sports team on iRacing. He was featured in 2011 racing video game Shift 2: Unleashed.

Early life
Milner was born on 28 January 1986. His passion for racing started when he would watch and observe his father's racing team, currently known as PTG Racing Inc. Milner even states: Always in the summertime, when I was off school I’d go up to the shop almost every day and I’d just kind of hang out at the shop there and interact with all the crew guys and ride around all the pit equipment around the parking lot and stuff like that. It was fun being there. The crew guys were fun to hang out with always and it was cool to be around the race team.At a young age, Milner would test and consult amateur racing game mods, whom of which are now the founders of Slightly Mad Studios.

Career
Milner started karting at the age of 14 and began his career as a sports car driver in the 2004 and 2005 Grand-Am seasons. He drove for Panoz in 2006 and 2008 and for Rahal Letterman Racing in 2007, 2009 and 2010 in the American Le Mans Series. In 2010 he finished 3rd in the GT Driver's Championship. In 2011, he decided to make the switch to Corvette Racing. In addition to driving for Corvette Racing, he also drove for Team Need for Speed Schubert at the 2011 24 Hours of Nürburgring. Currently he drives the Chevrolet Corvette C8.R with co-driver Jordan Taylor.

The highlight of Milner's career so far is a class victory at the 2011 24 Hours of Le Mans driving a Chevrolet Corvette C6.R with teammates Antonio García and Olivier Beretta. He also won his first American Le Mans Series race at the 2012 American Le Mans Series at Long Beach. In 2013 he took his first-class victory at the 12 Hours of Sebring. He also achieved a class victory at the 2022 6 Hours of Monza driving the Chevrolet Corvette C8.R with co-driver Nick Tandy.

Personal life
Milner is currently married and has one daughter. He resides in Ashton, Virginia.

Racing record

Complete 24 Hours of Le Mans results

Complete WeatherTech SportsCar Championship results
(key) (Races in bold indicate pole position) (Races in italics indicate fastest lap)

* Season still in progress.

Complete FIA World Endurance Championship results

References

External links
 
 Tommy Milner's blog about his 2011 Le Mans GTE-Pro win

1986 births
American people of German descent
Living people
Racing drivers from Washington, D.C.
24 Hours of Le Mans drivers
American Le Mans Series drivers
Rolex Sports Car Series drivers
24 Hours of Daytona drivers
FIA World Endurance Championship drivers
WeatherTech SportsCar Championship drivers
Asian Le Mans Series drivers
Corvette Racing drivers
Multimatic Motorsports drivers
BMW M drivers
Rahal Letterman Lanigan Racing drivers
Nürburgring 24 Hours drivers
24H Series drivers